Grand Forks is the third-largest city in the State of North Dakota, US.

Grand Forks may also refer to:

Places
Canada
 Grand Forks, British Columbia
 Grand Forks, Yukon
United States
 Greater Grand Forks, a metropolitan area in North Dakota and Minnesota, including:
 East Grand Forks, Minnesota
 Grand Forks Air Force Base, North Dakota
 Grand Forks County, North Dakota
 Grand Forks Township, Polk County, Minnesota

Other uses
 Grand Forks Herald, a newspaper in Grand Forks, North Dakota, US
 Grand Forks Public Schools, the school district encompassing Grand Forks, North Dakota
 Grand Forks (album)
 Grand Forks: A History of American Dining in 128 Reviews, a 2013 book by Marilyn Hagerty